Giuseppe "Beppe" Severgnini  (born 26 December 1956) is an Italian journalist, essayist and columnist.

Biography 
Born in Crema, Severgnini graduated in law at the University of Pavia. His father was a public notary.
His career in journalism began when, aged 24, he joined the Milan daily newspaper Il Giornale, headed by Italian journalist Indro Montanelli; he soon distinguished himself as a writer and became the paper's London correspondent.

For Il Giornale, in the period leading up to the fall of Communism, he worked as special correspondent from Russia, China and several Eastern European countries. 
When Montanelli left Il Giornale to found La Voce, Severgnini followed him.
He was also seconded to The Economist in London (1993) then served as correspondent for La Voce from Washington.

He was a correspondent from Italy for The Economist between 1996 and 2003, for which he still occasionally writes. He was a contributing opinion writer for The New York Times from 2013 to 2021.

Following the failure of Montanelli's project at La Voce, in 1995 Severgnini joined the Corriere della Sera, Italy's biggest newspaper, for which he currently is an op-ed columnist and an editor. 
Since 1998, he hosts a daily column for the online edition of the Corriere della Sera called Italians, originally targeting Italian expatriates; it has steadily grown in popularity since, eventually becoming one of the most read regular features of the newspaper's website.

An enthusiastic soccer fan, he also wrote for the popular sports newspaper La Gazzetta dello Sport from 2001 to 2011.

Severgnini appears regularly on radio and TV programs on RAI, La7, NPR and the BBC. He was the host of a talk show on SKY TG24 from 2004 to 2011 and for RAI in 2015 and 2016.

He is the author of twenty books, including the American bestsellers Ciao, America! An Italian Discovers the U.S. and La Bella Figura: A Field Guide to the Italian Mind. His most recent books are Off the Rail – A Train Trip Through Life (Berkley, New York 2019) and Neoitaliani (Rizzoli, Milan 2020), which will be published in 2022 in the US as Italian Lessons: 50 Things We Know About Life Now (Viking Penguin Books USA)

Beppe Severgnini taught at the Walter Tobagi graduate School of Journalism at the University of Milan (2010–2020). He has been a research fellow/writer in residence at MIT/Massachusetts Institute of Technology (2009), Isaiah Berlin Visiting Scholar at Oxford University (2013) and a visiting fellow at Ca' Foscari Venezia (2013); he has taught also at Middlebury College Vermont (2006), and at the universities of Milan-Bocconi (2003 and 2006), Parma (1998) and Pavia (2002), which elected him Alumnus of the Year in 1998 and 2011.

Beppe Severgnini was made Officer of the Order of the British Empire in 2001 by Queen Elizabeth II. He was also made Commendatore of the Order of Merit of the Italian Republic by President Giorgio Napolitano in 2011.

He's a Roman Catholic but criticises the Church for its opposition to anti-homophobic violence laws.

Bibliography 
Parlar sul Serio. Storie di Crema, 1979-1981, Crema, Artigrafiche Leva, 1981 .
Inglesi, Milano, Rizzoli, 1990 . 
L'inglese. Lezioni semiserie, Milano, Rizzoli, 1992 . 
Italiani con valigia. Il Belpaese in viaggio, Milano, Rizzoli, 1993 . 
L'inglese. Nuove lezioni semiserie, Milano, Biblioteca universale Rizzoli, 1994 . 
Un italiano in America, Milano, Rizzoli, 1995 . 
Confronti, Milano, Rizzoli, 1996 . 
Italiani si diventa, Milano, Rizzoli, 1998 . 
Manuale dell'imperfetto viaggiatore, Milano, Rizzoli, 2000 . 
Interismi. Il piacere di essere neroazzurri, Milano, Rizzoli, 2002 . 
Manuale dell'uomo domestico, Milano, Rizzoli, 2002 . 
Altri interismi. Un nuovo viaggio nel favoloso labirinto neroazzurro, Milano, Rizzoli, 2003 . 
Manuale dell'imperfetto sportivo, Milano, Rizzoli, 2003 . 
La testa degli italiani, Milano, Rizzoli, 2005 . 
L'italiano. Lezioni semiserie, Milano, Rizzoli, 2007 . 
Tripli interismi! Lieto fine di un romanzo neroazzurro, Milano, Rizzoli, 2007 . 
Manuale del perfetto interista, Milano, BUR extra, 2007 . 
Italians. Il giro del mondo in 80 pizze, Milano, Rizzoli, 2008 . 
Manuale dell'uomo normale, Milano, BUR, 2008 . 
Manuale del perfetto turista, Milano, BUR extra, 2009 . 
Imperfetto manuale di lingue, Milano, BUR extra, 2010 . 
Eurointerismi. La gioia di essere neroazzurri, Milano, Rizzoli, 2010 . 
La pancia degli italiani. Berlusconi spiegato ai posteri, Milano, Rizzoli, 2010 . 
Italiani di domani, Milano, Rizzoli, 2012 .

References

External links 
  
Italians, daily web column of Severgnini for Corriere.it 

Booknotes interview with Severgnini on Ciao America! An Italian Discovers the U.S., July 28, 2002.
Official OMRI webpage 

1956 births
Living people
People from Crema, Lombardy
Italian journalists
Italian male journalists
Italian Roman Catholics
University of Pavia alumni
Academic staff of the University of Parma
Academic staff of the University of Pavia
Honorary Officers of the Order of the British Empire
Commanders of the Order of Merit of the Italian Republic